Knight & Daye is an American sitcom that aired on NBC from July 8 to August 14, 1989. The show was about a pair of radio broadcasters, Hank Knight and Everett Daye, who hadn't spoken to each other in years; despite their estrangement, they accept an offer to work together on the air again, and try their best to get along.

Cast
 Jack Warden as Hank Knight
 Mason Adams as Everett Daye
 Hope Lange as Gloria Daye
 Shiri Appleby as Amy Escobar
 Julia Campbell as Janet Glickman
 Joe Cipriano as "Marty in the Morning"
 Glenn Walker Harris Jr. as Dougie Escobar
 Lela Ivey as Ellie Escobar
 Joe Lala as Cito Escobar
 Emily Schulman as Chris Escobar
 Brittany Thornton as Laurie Escobar

Episodes

References

External links
 
 

1989 American television series debuts
1989 American television series endings
1980s American sitcoms
English-language television shows
NBC original programming
Television duos
Television series about radio
Television shows set in San Diego
Television series by Imagine Entertainment